Proto-oncogene tyrosine-protein kinase Yes is a non-receptor tyrosine kinase that in humans is encoded by the YES1 gene. 

This gene is the cellular homolog of the Yamaguchi sarcoma virus oncogene. The encoded protein has tyrosine kinase activity and belongs to the src family. This gene lies in close proximity to thymidylate synthase gene on chromosome 18, and a corresponding pseudogene has been found on chromosome 22.

Interactions
YES1 has been shown to interact with Janus kinase 2, CTNND1, RPL10 and Occludin.

References

Further reading

External links